The Dutch Reformed Church in Botswana was founded by Swiss missionaries led by the Rev. Henri Gronin begun working in 1863 among the tribe Bakgatla, Kgafela in Saulsport and Rustenburg in South Africa. In 1870 part of the tribe moved north to Botswana and the missionaries followed them. The great chief was baptised and most of the tribe followed him. In 1966 when Botswana become independent, a Synod of the Reformed Church was formed. In the 1970s the church gained independence. The church in the following years expanded to Basarwa, Bakalanga and Bakgatla.

The denomination has 6,000 members and 13 parishes with 50 house fellowships in 2 presbyteries and one Synod. The 14 churches are in : Muchudi, Muchudi East, Muchudi West, Sikwane, Gaborone, Tlokweng, Lobatse, Kgalagadi, Ghanzi, Maun, Makaleng, Selebi Phikwe, Boseja (Mochudi).

The church subscribe the Reformed confessions:
Apostles Creed
Nicene Creed
Canons of Dort
Heidelberg Catechism.

Ecumenical relations
The church is member of the World Communion of Reformed Churches. It is also a member of the Botswana Council of Churches.

References

Reformed denominations in Africa
Members of the World Communion of Reformed Churches
Protestantism in Botswana
1863 establishments in Africa